Peder Jensen may refer to:

Peder Are Nøstvold Jensen, Norwegian blogger who uses the alias Fjordman
Peder Jensen (bishop), Bishop of Lund between 1355 and 1361
Peder Jensen (equestrian) (1897-1938), Danish equestrian
Peder Jensen Fauchald (1791-1856), Norwegian politician
Peder Vilhelm Jensen-Klint (1853-1930), Danish architect, designer, painter and architectural theorist

See also
Peter Jensen (disambiguation)